List of shipwrecks in November 1853 includes ships sunk, foundered, wrecked, grounded, or otherwise lost during November 1853.

1 November

2 November

3 November

4 November

5 November

6 November

7 November

8 November

9 November

10 November

11 November

12 November

13 November

14 November

15 November

16 November

17 November

18 November

19 November

20 November

21 November

22 November

23 November

24 November

25 November

26 November

27 November

28 November

29 November

30 November

Unknown date

References

1853-11